There are over 15 buildings in Kampala, the capital of Uganda, with 10 or more stories in height. This list ranks Kampala skyscrapers, based on standard height measurement. This includes spires and architectural details but does not include antenna masts. An equal sign (=) following a rank indicates the same height between two or more buildings. The "Year" column indicates the year in which a building was completed or is expected to be completed.

Completed

Under construction

Proposed

See also
 List of tallest buildings in Africa
 List of tallest buildings in the world

References

Tallest, Kampala
Uganda, Kampala
Buildings and structures in Kampala